The Mocho-Choshuenco National Reserve is a natural reserve around the Mocho-Choshuenco volcano, in Los Ríos Region, southern Chile. The reserve was created by decree in March 1994 and covers  distributed in Panguipulli, Los Lagos and Futrono municipality.
The principal access goes from the Pan American Highway to Enco passing by Panguipulli and Choshuenco. From Enco a small way goes to the refuge area, during the summer months tracked vehicles can go there.

Mocho-Choshuenco National Reserve has no park guards or any public infrastructure. In the refuge sector there is a mountain hut leased to Los Lagos municipality, some old military buildings ruins, and the rests of a small ski centre.

Gallery

References

External links
  A specialized blog about Mocho-Choshuenco National Reserve at mochochoshuenco.blogspot.com

National reserves of Chile
Protected areas of Los Ríos Region
Protected areas established in 1994
1994 establishments in Chile
1994 in Chilean law
Valdivian temperate rainforest